Yukarışahinler is a village in the Arhavi District, Artvin Province, Turkey. Its population is 222 (2021).

History
It gained village status before 1965. The old name of village was "Jileni Napşit".

Geography
Güvercinli is located to the north, Derecik is located to the south, Tepeyurt is located to the east, and Ulukent is located to the west of the village. The altitude of the village is 328 meters. The climate of the village is in the Black Sea climate. The village is 87 km away from the city of Artvin and 11 km away from the Arhavi town center.

Economy 
The villages economy is based on agriculture and animal husbandry. There are two place of tea intake belonging to Lipton and Çaykur in village.

Population

Mukhtar
Mukhtars according to selected years:

2009 - Turan Toraman
2004 - Coşkun Atalan
1999 - Coşkun Atalan
1994 - Coşkun Atalan
1989 - İmdat Yıldızbayrak
1984 - İmdat Yıldızbayrak
1977 - Mustafa Özyılmaz
1973 - Mustafa Özyılmaz

References

Villages in Arhavi District
Laz settlements in Turkey